Arenal may refer to:

People with the surname 
Concepción Arenal (1820–1893), Spanish feminist writer and activist
Electa Arenal (1935–1969), Mexican muralist
Luis Arenal Bastar (c. 1900–1985), Mexican painter, engraver and sculptor
Elena Huerta de Arenal (1908–1997), Mexican muralist

Places 
Arenal, Arizona, one of the 19th century Pima Villages
Arenal, Yoro, a municipality in Honduras
Arenal del Sur, a town in Bolívar Department, Colombia
Arenal d'en Castell, a small town in Es Mercadal, Minorca
Nuevo Arenal, a town and district in Tilarán Canton, Costa Rica
Arenal Airport, an airport serving La Fortuna, Costa Rica
Arenal Botanical Gardens, on the shore of Lake Arenal, Costa Rica
Arenal Bridge, a reinforced concrete bridge in Bilbao, Spain
Arenal District, Paita, Peru
Arenal River, Costa Rica, a tributary of the San Carlos River
Arenal Volcano, a volcano in Costa Rica
Lake Arenal, a lake in Costa Rica

Other uses 
UD Arenal, a football team based in S'Arenal de Llucmajor, Balearic Islands

See also 
 El Arenal (disambiguation)
 Arenal District (disambiguation)